Modelur is a 3D parametric urban design software, implemented as a SketchUp plugin.

In contrast to common CAD applications, where the user designs buildings with usual dimensions such as width, depth, and height, Modelur offers the design of built environment through key urban parameters such as the number of storeys and gross floor area of a building. In addition, urban control values (i.e. Floor Space Index, Built-up Area, etc. ) and requirements (i.e. number of parking lots or green areas) based on land use normatives are calculated in real-time.

Sources
 Trimble SketchUp
 Modelur on SketchUp Extension Warehouse
 Modelur on YouTube

External links
 Modelur Homepage
 Modelur Userguide
 SketchUp Extension Warehouse

Urban design
Urban planning
Computer-aided design software
Computer-aided design
3D computer graphics